John Francis Currie (22 December 1915 – 11 July 1974) was an Australian rules footballer who played with Richmond in the Victorian Football League (VFL).

Notes

External links 

1915 births
1974 deaths
Australian rules footballers from Melbourne
Richmond Football Club players
People from Richmond, Victoria